Dorwin Philip Cartwright (March 3, 1915 – July 18, 2008) was an American social psychologist, and considered one of the founders of the field of group dynamics. Cartwright's research and writing topics included the mathematical foundations of group dynamics, the sources of social power, the nature of group structure and the causes of risk taking in groups. He was a professor of psychology at the University of Michigan for 31 years.

References 

1915 births
2008 deaths
20th-century American psychologists
Harvard University alumni
University of Michigan faculty